Kamikaze-class destroyer may refer to:

 Kamikaze-class destroyer (1905), 32 destroyers for the Imperial Japanese Navy which were built in 1904–1909, and were in commission from 1905 to 1928.
 Kamikaze-class destroyer (1922), 9 destroyers for the Imperial Japanese Navy which were built in 1921 to 1925, and were in commission from 1922 to 1947.

See also
 Kamikaze (disambiguation)
 Japanese destroyer Kamikaze

Destroyers of the Imperial Japanese Navy